WNMC-FM (90.7 FM) is a public radio station in Traverse City, Michigan, and is licensed to the trustees of Northwestern Michigan College (NMC). The station has block programming, mostly jazz and blues during the daytime, Americana in the late afternoon, and rock programming at night, but also playing alternative country, world music, and electronica.

History
The station began life in 1967 as a student organization broadcasting to the dormitories at NMC as a carrier-current station. The move to become an FM station was started by NMC students Tod Redfern, Wayne Niebroski, Malcolm Brooks, and Dennis Panagopoulus in 1976. In 1979, WNMC made its FM debut at 90.9, broadcasting at a mere 10 watts, and in 1981, they boosted power again to 150 watts, covering Traverse City and approximately six miles radius of surrounding territory.

In 1997, WNMC boosted their power once more to 600 watts and moved to its current frequency, 90.7. The station now broadcasts from the relay tower of WPBN-TV 7 & 4, Traverse City's NBC station.

The station is supported by student activity fees, listener donations and business underwriting.  Northwestern Michigan College supplies bookkeeping and fundraising as well as a space to operate from.  The annual budget is approximately $90,000.

Staff
WNMC is staffed mostly community volunteers ranging in age from 16 to 70+, from all over its service area. One of the station's jazz programs was once hosted by WPBN news anchor Dave Walker, who started his radio career at WKLA in Ludington, Michigan in the 1960s.

Ben Hamper author of Rivethead currently hosts two programs on the station: Soul Possession (soul & funk), 9–11pm Fridays and Head for the Hills (hillbilly obscurities) 10–noon on Sunday.

Astronomer, NASA Ambassador, and former station manager Michael Foerster hosts a science feature on the Friday morning show circa 7:15am.

The station's only employee is Eric Hines.  Eric was a journalist prior to being recruited for the position.  His previous experience in radio was with WRSU-FM on the station's Radio Council. Eric is responsible for almost all the functions of the station.  He even is heard on the air several times a week.  In cheese circles Hines is famous for inventing Stringburger, a string cheese variant of the famed, pungent Limburger.

In recent years, the station added a morning show, hosted by Peter Strong, General Manager Eric Hines, Diane Hines, Dave Gault and several other community volunteers. Strong previously worked in northern Michigan radio in the early 80s and worked in Colorado not too long ago. The program is a mixture of news, music and chat.

The station has recently begun automated broadcasts from 2 to 6am, and now generally broadcasts 24 hours a day.

Programming 
WNMC broadcasts a wide variety of music, most of it otherwise unavailable on the radio dial in its service area. Jazz, blues, alternative rock, folk, world music and local music are primary areas of concentration. Specialty shows feature new age, alternative country, African, Latin American, and a host of other style and genres. The station's schedule is available here, and both archived and current playlists can be accessed through WNMC's Spinitron page.

See also
List of community radio stations in the United States

References

External links

NMC-FM
Community radio stations in the United States
Radio stations established in 1967
Northwestern Michigan College